Kam Tin Shi is a village in Kam Tin, in the Yuen Long District of the New Territories of Hong Kong.

Administration
Kam Tin Shi is a recognized village under the New Territories Small House Policy.

References

Villages in Yuen Long District, Hong Kong
Kam Tin